John Coventre may refer to:

John Coventre (MP for Devizes) (died c.1430)
John Coventre (MP for Chipping Wycombe)  (died c.1440)

See also
John Coventry (disambiguation)